The MGM Resorts Championship at Paiute is a golf tournament on the Korn Ferry Tour. It was first played in April 2021 on the Sun Mountain Course at Las Vegas Paiute Golf Resort near Las Vegas, Nevada.

Winners

Bolded golfers graduated to the PGA Tour via the Korn Ferry Tour regular-season money list.

References

External links
Coverage on the Korn Ferry Tour's official site

Former Korn Ferry Tour events
Golf in Nevada
2021 establishments in Nevada
2021 disestablishments in Nevada